Meitei folklore is the folklore and mythology of the Meitei people of Manipur, India.

Such folklore is traditionally passed from generation to generation. Currently, the government of Manipur is planning to preserve the folklore of the Meitei people through primary education in government institutions.

References

Indian folklore
Meitei culture